Nigel Anthony Batch (born 9 November 1957) is an English former footballer who played in the Football League for Derby County, Darlington, Grimsby Town, Scunthorpe United and Stockport County. He was Lincoln City's goalkeeper as they won the 1987–88 Football Conference title, and a member of Darlington's squad as they won the same title in 1989–90.

References

1957 births
Living people
English footballers
Association football goalkeepers
Grimsby Town F.C. players
Lincoln City F.C. players
Darlington F.C. players
Stockport County F.C. players
Scunthorpe United F.C. players
English Football League players
National League (English football) players